Kharum may refer to
 A fictional country in the second season of Borgen
Kharun Rah
Seven Towers of Kharun